The 1959 TCU Horned Frogs football team represented Texas Christian University (TCU) in the 1959 NCAA University Division football season. The Horned Frogs finished the season 8–3 overall and 5–1 in the Southwest Conference. The team was coached by Abe Martin in his seventh year as head coach. The Frogs played their home games in Amon G. Carter Stadium, which is located on campus in Fort Worth, Texas. They were invited to the Bluebonnet Bowl, where they lost to Clemson by a score of 23–7.

Schedule

References

TCU
TCU Horned Frogs football seasons
Southwest Conference football champion seasons
TCU Horned Frogs football